DE48 may refer to:
 Delaware Route 48